Karen L. Parker was born in Salisbury, North Carolina and grew up in Winston-Salem, North Carolina.  She was the first African-American woman undergraduate to attend the University of North Carolina at Chapel Hill in 1963 following two years of study at the North Carolina Women’s College in Greensboro (now University of North Carolina at Greensboro); before that, Parker worked for the Winston-Salem Journal.  She majored in journalism, was elected vice-president of the UNC Press Club, and served as editor of the UNC Journalist, the School of Journalism's newspaper in 1964.  After graduating in 1965, Parker was a copy editor for the Grand Rapids Press in Grand Rapids, Michigan.  She also worked for the Los Angeles Times and other newspapers before returning to the Winston-Salem Journal.

Ellyn Bache used Parker's diary when conducting research for her 1997 novel The Activist's Daughter, about student activists at the University of North Carolina at Chapel Hill in 1963.

References

External links
 Inventory of the Karen L. Parker Diary, 1963-1966, in the Southern Historical Collection, UNC-Chapel Hill.

University of North Carolina at Chapel Hill alumni